Negress is the female form of the word Negro.

Negress  may also refer to:

A Negress, oil painting by Anna Bilińska-Bohdanowicz
The Negress, bronze sculpture by Jean-Baptiste Carpeaux